Pak Chun Hwa is the chairperson of the Management Board of the Ripsok Cooperative Farm in Sungho district. On 4 January 2007, in Pyongyang, he gave a speech at a mass rally, with other high government officials, praising Songun Korea.

References 

Year of birth missing (living people)
Living people
North Korean politicians
Place of birth missing (living people)